Denise Infante (born 22 November 1980) is a Chilean field hockey player.

Personal life
Denise Infante is the youngest of four sisters, Daniela, Camila and Paula, all of whom play international hockey for Chile.

Infante studied and played hockey at American University.

Career

Junior National Team
Infante was a member of the Chilean Under 21 side at the 2005 Junior World Cup held in her hometown, Santiago, Chile. Her sister, Camila, was also a member of the team that finished 10th.

Senior National Team
After representing Chile over a number of years, Infante retired in 2012 after the team failed to qualify for the 2012 Olympic Games in London, United Kingdom.

References

1986 births
Living people
Chilean female field hockey players
Pan American Games medalists in field hockey
Pan American Games bronze medalists for Chile
Field hockey players at the 2011 Pan American Games
Medalists at the 2011 Pan American Games
21st-century Chilean women